Jaya Pala (1075-1100) was a ruler during the Pala Dynasty (900–1100) of Kamarupa Kingdom.

About
A member of the Brahma Pala dynasty, Jaya Pala ruled over Kamarupa at the close of the 11th century. He is mentioned in a Siliinpur stone inscription concerning Prasati of a Brahmin named Prahasa who is credited with construction of a 
temple, creation of a garden, and excavation of a tank. The inscription states that Prahasa, though persistently pressed, refused to accept "900 gold coins and a gift of landed property from Jaya Pala, king of Kamarupa, on the occasion of "tulapurusha dana" (=great gift ceremony which involved the gift of gold etc. equal to the weight of the performer) performed by the latter". 

It is important to note the attribution of the conquest of Kamarupa to the Pala King Ram Pala (1077-1133 AD) of Gauda by Sandhyakar Nandi in his ramacharitam because it is supported by the Kamauli plates of Vaidyadeva.

References

Further reading
   
 
 
 
 
 
 
 
 
 
 
 
 

Pala dynasty (Kamarupa)
1075 births
1100 deaths
11th-century Indian monarchs